Edward Talbot may refer to:

Edward Talbot, 8th Earl of Shrewsbury (1561–1617)
Edward Kelley (1555–1597), also known as Edward Talbot, notorious English criminal and medium
Edward Talbot (bishop) (1844–1934), Anglican bishop
Edward Talbot (priest) (1693–1720), Archdeacon of Berkshire, son of William Talbot
Edward Allen Talbot (1796–1839), immigrant to Upper Canada
Edward Keble Talbot (1877–1949), English Anglican priest

See also
Edward Talbot Thackeray (1836–1927), British recipient of the Victoria Cross